The  Fannie L. Daugherty  is a Chesapeake Bay skipjack, built in 1904 at Crisfield, Maryland. She is a  two-sail bateau, or "V"-bottomed deadrise type of centerboard sloop. She one of the 35 surviving traditional Chesapeake Bay skipjacks and a member of the last commercial sailing fleet in the United States. She is located at Wenona, Somerset County, Maryland.

She was listed on the National Register of Historic Places in 1985. She is assigned Maryland dredge number 58, and was previously dredge 2.

References

External links
, including photo in 1983, at Maryland Historical Trust

Somerset County, Maryland
Skipjacks
Ships on the National Register of Historic Places in Maryland
1904 ships
National Register of Historic Places in Somerset County, Maryland